Tatoid dilalects are dialects of the Tati language spoken in  the Iranian provinces of Gilan, Qazvin and Alborz.
Tatoid two Tati like ofshoots Rudbari, Taleghani and Alamuti.
Tatoid includes the Rudbari, Taleghani and Alamuti dialects.  According to Stilo, this special status for this recent type is that these two varieties were originally Tatic which, under the intense influences of Caspian and Persian, have lost all their Tatic grammatical structures.

Alamuti dialect 
According to some sources, the  people in northern Qazvin (Alamut) speak a dialect of the Tati language. However, other sources state that the people of Alamut are Mazanderani or Gilaks who speak a dialect of the Mazandarani or Gilaki language. According to some linguists, the term ‘Tati’ was used by Turkic speakers to refer to non-turkic speakers. This could explain why some sources  refer to the Alamut dialects as Tatoid, while others claim they are Mazandarani or Gilaki. Likely, the ‘Tatoid dialect’ of Alamut is a dialect of Mazanderani or Gilaki, which was  labeled as Tati as historically the dialect was considered Mazanderani or Gilaki.

See also
 Tati language
 Tat people (Iran)
 Northwestern Iranian languages

Further reading

References 

Northwestern Iranian languages
Endangered languages of Iran
Caspian languages